Phantom Regiment Drum and Bugle Corps (commonly referred to as "Phantom") is a World Class competitive junior drum and bugle corps based in Rockford, Illinois, USA. The corps is a long-standing member of Drum Corps International (DCI), having been a DCI World Championship Top Twelve Finalist every year since 1974 and DCI World Champions in 1996 (tie) and 2008.

History 
The corps was founded in 1956 by Alex Haddad, a member of the Col. Thomas G. Lawler VFW Post 342. Under his direction, the corps was named the Rockford Rangers, with all-male  drum and bugle sections and an all-female color guard to named the Rangerettes. However, when many of the charter members were impressed by the recording of the Syracuse Brigadiers performing the Leroy Anderson composition The Phantom Regiment, the corps' name was changed before the unit made its debut, with the color guard renamed the Phantomettes.

In the corps' early years, the Phantomettes and a corps-sponsored all-boy color guard called the Raiders were competitively successful. The drum and bugle corps, however, struggled. In 1962, the corps bought a set of high quality bugles that had belonged to the Commonwealth Edison Knights of Light Drum and Bugle Corps which had folded two years earlier. With the new instruments and a new brass arranger, the corps began to improve. The old set of bugles went to the newly formed Phantom Regiment Cadets.

Despite the Phantomettes having placed second at the 1962 color guard national championships, in 1963, Phantom Regiment fielded an all-male corps, including the color guard. When scores fell behind those of the previous season, the Phantomettes returned to the corps for 1964. With the girls back in the corps, successful recruitment, and new uniforms, the corps had its best season until that time, including a finish of 15th among 45 corps at the VFW National Championship preliminaries in Cleveland. The Phantomettes were honored in the graphic on the City of Rockford's 1964 vehicle registration stickers. But on August 21, 1964 Regimental Hall, the corps' home base, was badly damaged by a fire. The organization was forced to sell its instruments and uniforms to pay off its debts.

Financially unable to field a corps in 1965 through 1967, alumni and former staff members reorganized  and officially incorporated on September 11, 1967. At the first meeting of the newly restructured corps in January, there were 28 members. The Regiment's 1968 drum and horn lines dressed in black pants and a red windbreaker with a black and white vertical stripe on the left side; the guard wore the same windbreaker, black Bermuda shorts and an "Aussie" style hat. The season consisted mostly of parades, with few field contests. The corps owned one vehicle; a red step van to carry the equipment. In that first year of the corps' return, perhaps the corps' greatest asset was its new musical arranger, Phantom Regiment alumnus and future DCI Hall of Fame member, Jim Wren, who would go on to arrange the unit's brass music for the next 32 years.

By 1970, Phantom was able to outfit the corps in new uniforms; a cadet-style jacket with a red diagonal sash dividing the black white side from the white left side, black pants with a white stripe, white buck shoes, and a shako with a 12-inch plume. The corps had grown to 89 members with 40 horns, 14 drums, 24 flags, 12 rifles, and a drum major.

In 1971, Wren started adding the classical music pieces that would become Phantom's trademark along with the usual pop music that most corps were playing. On a Friday the 13th in that year, so the legend goes, all of the corps' buses ran out of fuel; the equipment truck caught fire, not just once, but twice; yet the corps went out and won that night's contest.

Prior to the founding of DCI in 1972, the Phantom Regiment, like most corps of the time, was strictly a local organization. The members and the staff came from Rockford and its surrounding suburbs. Travel to contests was limited to perhaps a few hours of driving. The only "National" competition the corps had ever entered had been the 1964 VFW championships in Cleveland. The corps attended the first DCI competition, in Whitewater, Wisconsin, placing 23rd of 39 corps in prelims. In 1973, The corps returned to Whitewater and moved up to 14th place among 48 corps.

In 1974, Phantom presented its first full program of all-classical musical selections. The corps had grown to DCI's maximum of 128 members, and it took its first extended tour, travelling to Kentucky, Ohio, Pennsylvania, and Massachusetts en route to the DCI Championships in Ithaca, New York. The corps was beating many of the activity's traditional powers and earning a reputation as a power in its own right. At DCI, the Regiment earned its first Top Twelve Finalist placement, beginning a string that has held through 2019. In prelims, the corps shocked many by placing 8th, although they fell back to 11th at Finals.

Once the corps became a DCI Finalist, it also became become a consistent contender, placing 10th in 1975, 4th in 1976, and having a frustrating run of second-place finishes in 1977, 1978 and 1979 with the corps scoring within tenths of a point from the title.

A fall to a 10th-place finish in 1986 led the corps to take a new approach. Three years of improvement, culminated in 1989 with another second-place finish, with Phantom's score of 98.400 tying the previous DCI highest score ever.

From 1975, Phantom Regiment's field shows had been designed by future DCI Hall of Fame member John Brazale to maximize the musical impact while often amazing the audience. Returning home after the 1992 DCI Championships, Brazale had complained of having severe headaches during the last few weeks, and was soon diagnosed with an inoperable brain tumor, and died within months.

In 1996, Phantom Regiment tied the Blue Devils of Concord, California for its first DCI World Championship. Jim Wren arranged for the corps from 1967 through the 1999 season, and then retired as the corps' musical arranger. Michael Klesch took over arranging duties in 2000 and 2001, and was then followed by alumnus J.D. Shaw, who arranged the corps' music from the 2002 season through the 2011 season. After spending the 2012–2019 seasons with the Santa Clara Vanguard, J.D. Shaw returned to Phantom Regiment after the 2019 season.

In 2008, with its performance of "Spartacus", Phantom Regiment defeated the Blue Devils Drum and Bugle Corps by a margin of 0.025 to win its second (and first outright) DCI World Championship.

Through 2019, Phantom Regiment has continued to be a DCI Finalist with the streak extending through 45 consecutive top-12 finishes. In 2022, the first year of competition since the COVID-19 Pandemic, Phantom Regiment returned with their highest placement since 2016, and highest score since 2014.

Show summary (1972–2022) 
Source:

Caption awards 
At the annual World Championship Finals, Drum Corps International (DCI) presents awards to the corps with the high average scores from prelims, semifinals, and finals in five captions. Phantom Regiment has won these caption awards.

Don Angelica Best General Effect Award
 2008
Fred Sanford Best Percussion Performance Award
 2006, 2008, 2010

Prior to 2000 and the adoption of the current scoring format, Phantom Regiment won these captions:

High General Effect Award
 1991 (tie), 1996
High Visual Award
 1979, 1980, 1989, 1990 (tie)
High Color Guard Award
 1977, 1979, 1988 
High Brass Award
 1978, 1989, 1996

References

External links
Official website

Drum Corps International World Class corps
Culture of Rockford, Illinois
Musical groups established in 1956
1956 establishments in Illinois